Bon Sefid (also Romanized as Bon Sefīd) is a village in Soghan Rural District, Soghan District, Arzuiyeh County, Kerman Province, Iran. At the 2006 census, its population was 58, in 16 families.

References 

Populated places in Arzuiyeh County